David Harries or D. C. Harries (the 'C' was fictional to distinguish him from others of the same name locally) was a Welsh photographer who operated from premises in Llandeilo and Ammanford, Wales, from approximately 1891 until his death in 1940 aged 75. In 1976  his collection of glass negatives, many thousand, were donated to the National Library of Wales. In December 2014 his military portraits were the subject of a 2014 paper given at the Understanding British Portraits seminar at the National Portrait Gallery, London.

References

Obituary, Carmarthen Journal, March 8, 1940
Kellys Trades Directory for South Wales & Monmouthshire, 1891

Welsh photographers
British portrait photographers
People from Carmarthenshire
1940 deaths
1860s births